James King Annand MBE (2 February 1908 – 8 June 1993) was a Scottish poet best known for his children's poems.

Biography 
Born at Edinburgh to Maggie Gold and her husband, plumber William Annand, He was educated at Broughton Secondary School, and he graduated from the University of Edinburgh in 1930. He later taught at schools in Edinburgh and Whithorn. Annand also translated poetry and fiction from German and medieval Latin into Scots. He was the founding editor of Lallans, a magazine for writing in Scots published by the Scots Language Society, from 1973 to 1983. HIs poem 'Arctic Convoy' won the 1956 prize for Best Original Poem in the Scottish Dialect of the Burns Federation 

He died in Edinburgh in 1993.

Collections of children's poetry
 Sing it Aince for Pleisure (1970)
 Twice for Joy (1973)
 Thrice to Show Ye (1979)
 A Wale o Rhymes (1989); reissued in 1998 as Bairn Rhymes

Other works
 Two Voices (1968)
 Poems and translations (1975)
 Songs from Carmina burana (1978)
 A Scots handsel (1980)
 Selected Poems, 1925-1990 (1992)

Recognition
 1958 - chairman of the Edinburgh Branch of the Saltire Society.
 1979 - Scottish Arts Council special award for his contribution to Scottish Poetry.
 1993 - Posthumous MBE for his services to Scots Language and Literature.
 2008 - Commemorative stone in the Makars' Court
 2015 - Posthumous award of the Arctic Star for his war service in the Royal Navy during WW2

References

1908 births
1993 deaths
Alumni of the University of Edinburgh
Lallans poets
Scots Makars
Members of the Order of the British Empire
20th-century Scottish poets
Scottish male poets
20th-century British male writers
20th-century British writers